Saint George Episcopal Church is an historic Carpenter Gothic style Episcopal church located at 10560 East Fort George Road on Fort George Island in Jacksonville, Florida, in the United States. Built in 1882–1883, it was designed by architect Robert S. Schuyler of nearby Fernandina.

On August 9, 2002, it was added to the U.S. National Register of Historic Places as St. George Episcopal Church. It was a mission of the Diocese of Florida until 1990 when it became active parish.

Gallery

See also

 St. George's Episcopal Church (disambiguation)

References

External links

 St. George Episcopal Church website
 St. George's history
 Duval County listings at National Register of Historic Places
 Duval County markers at Florida's Office of Cultural and Historical Programs

National Register of Historic Places in Jacksonville, Florida
Churches on the National Register of Historic Places in Florida
Episcopal church buildings in Florida
Carpenter Gothic church buildings in Florida
Episcopal churches in Jacksonville, Florida
History of Jacksonville, Florida
1883 establishments in Florida
Churches completed in 1883
Fort George Island